The Qarabağ 2008–09 season was Qarabağ's 16th Azerbaijan Premier League season, and their first season under Gurban Gurbanov. They finished the season in 5th place, and won the Azerbaijan Cup defeating Inter Baku in the final.

Squad

Transfers

Summer

In:

Out:

Winter

In:

Out:

Competitions

Azerbaijan Premier League

Results summary

Results

Table

Azerbaijan Cup

Squad statistics

Appearances and goals

|-
|colspan="14"|Players who left Qarabağ on loan during the season:

|-
|colspan="14"|Players who appeared for Qarabağ who left during the season:

|}

Goal scorers

Notes
On 31 October 2008, FK NBC Salyan changed their name to FK Mughan.
Qarabağ have played their home games at the Tofiq Bahramov Stadium since 1993 due to the ongoing situation in Quzanlı.

References

External links
http://www.weltfussball.at/teams/fk-qarabag/2009/2/
https://web.archive.org/web/20140211091820/http://www.pfl.az/upload/arxiv/200809/oyuncustats200809.pdf
http://www.futbol24.com/national/Azerbaijan/Premier-League/2008-2009/results
 Qarabağ at Soccerway.com

Qarabağ FK seasons
Qarabag